Earthquakes are caused by movements within the Earth's crust and uppermost mantle. They range from events too weak to be detectable except by sensitive instrumentation, to sudden and violent events lasting many minutes which have caused some of the greatest disasters in human history. Below, earthquakes are listed by period, region or country, year, magnitude, cost, fatalities and number of scientific studies.

Lists by time period

By century
 Before 1901
 1901–2000
 2001–present

By year
 2023
 2022
 2021
 2020
 2019
 2018
 2017
 2016
 2015
 2014
 2013
 2012
 2011
 2010
 2009
 2008
 2007
 2006
 2005
 2004
 2003
 2002
 2001
 2000
 1999
 1998
 1997
 1996
 1995
 1994
 1993
 1992
 1991
 1990
 1989
 1988
 1987
 1986
 1985
 1984
 1983
 1982
 1981
 1980
 1979
 1978
 1977
 1976
 1975
 1974
 1973
 1972
 1971
 1970
 1969
 1968
 1967
 1966
 1965
 1964
 1963
 1962
 1961
 1960
 1959
 1958
 1957
 1956
 1955
 1954
 1953
 1952
 1951
 1950
 1949
 1948
 1947
 1946
 1945
 1944
 1943
 1942
 1941
 1940
 1939
 1938
 1937
 1936
 1935
 1934
 1933
 1932
 1931
 1930
 1929
 1928
 1927
 1926
 1925
 1924
 1923
 1922
 1921
 1920
 1919
 1918
 1917
 1916
 1915
 1914
 1913
 1912
 1911
 1910
 1909
 1908
 1907
 1906
 1905
 1904
 1903
 1902
 1901
 1900

Lists by country

 Afghanistan
 Albania 
 Algeria
 Argentina
 Mendoza Province
 Armenia
 Australia
 Azerbaijan
 Bangladesh
 Bosnia and Herzegovina
 Brazil
 Bulgaria
 Canada 
 Chile
 China
 Sichuan Province
 Yunnan Province
 Colombia
 Costa Rica
 Croatia
 Cuba
 Cyprus
 DR. Congo
 Dominican Republic
 East Timor (Timor Leste)
 Ecuador
 Egypt
 El Salvador
 Eritrea
 Ethiopia
 France
 Fiji
 Georgia
 Germany
 Ghana
 Greece
 Guam
 Guatemala
 Haiti
 Iceland
 India
 Indonesia
 Iran
 Israel
 Italy
 Irpinia
 Japan
 Jordan
 Kosovo
 Kyrgyzstan
 Lebanon
 Malaysia
 Mexico
 Morocco
 Myanmar 
 Nepal
 Netherlands
 New Zealand
 Nicaragua
 Pakistan
 Palestine
 Panama
 Papua New Guinea
 Peru
 Philippines
 Portugal
 Azores
 Romania
 Vrancea County
 Russia
 Samoa
 Saudi Arabia
 Slovenia
 Solomon Islands
 South Africa
 South Korea
 Spain
 Syria
 Taiwan
 Tajikistan
 Thailand
 Tonga
 Turkey
 United Kingdom
 United States
 Alaska
 California
 Hawaii
 Illinois
 Montana
 Nevada
 Oklahoma
 Puerto Rico
 South Carolina
 Texas
 Utah
 Washington
 Vanuatu
 Venezuela
 Yemen

Lists by region
Balkan
Caribbean
Levant
South Asia

Deadliest earthquakes by year

Largest earthquakes by year

Largest earthquakes by magnitude

Listed below are all the 45 known earthquakes with an estimated magnitude of 8.5 or higher since 1501. Limited to a timeframe with enough data, this gives a rough estimate of its frequency per century (The timeframe does not include outlying events like the earlier 1498 Meiō earthquake, 1420 Caldera earthquake, 1361 Shōhei earthquake, 1356 Lisbon earthquake, 869 Jōgan earthquake, and 365 Crete earthquake, each estimated to have magnitude ≥8.5.).

Prior to the development and deployment of seismographs – starting around 1900 – magnitudes can only be estimated, based on historical reports of the extent and severity of damage.

Historical records are known to be incomplete. Earthquakes that occurred in remote areas prior to the advent of modern instrumentation in the early to mid 1900s were not well-reported, and exact locations and magnitudes of such events are often unknown. Therefore, the apparent increase in large earthquake frequency over the last few centuries is unlikely to be accurate.

Largest earthquakes by country/territory 

 This list is a work in progress. Information is likely to be changed.
 The list refers to current country boundaries rather than those at the date of the earthquake.
 Please note, multiple countries could have the same earthquake listed, such as the 1906 Ecuador–Colombia earthquake being listed for both Ecuador and Colombia.	
 Unless otherwise noted, magnitudes are reported on the Moment magnitude scale (Mw).

Costliest earthquakes

This is the top ten major earthquakes by the dollar value of property (public and private) losses directly attributable to the earthquake.

Deadliest earthquakes

The following is a summary list of earthquakes with over approximately 100,000 deaths:

Most studied earthquakes 
The 50 most studied earthquakes according to the International Seismological Centre (ISC), based on a count of scientific papers (mostly in English) that discuss that earthquake. The "Event #" is linked to the ISC Event Bibliography for that event.

modified from figure 2, "The most studied events", at the ISC's Overview of the ISC Event Bibliography.

 2018.

See also

List of deadly earthquakes since 1900
List of historical earthquakes
List of natural disasters by death toll
Lists of earthquakes by year
List of megathrust earthquakes

References

External links

 USGS-ANSS Latest earthquakes around the world.
 Southern California Earthquake Center (SCEC)
 IRIS Seismic Monitor, Recent earthquakes around the world
 Recent New Zealand earthquakes
 SeismoArchives, Seismogram Archives of Significant Earthquakes of the World
 USGS list of earthquakes magnitude 6.0 and greater sorted by magnitude
 Database for the damage of world earthquake, ancient period (3000 BC) to year of 2006—Building Research Institute (Japan) (建築研究所)
 Largest Earthquakes in the World Since 1900